Cross is a 2011 American action fantasy film written by Patrick Durham, John Sachar, and Tanner Wiley. It was released direct-to-video.

A sequel called Cross Wars was released in 2017, and a third film Cross: Rise Of The Villains was released in 2019.

Plot 
Given incredible power by an ancient Celtic Cross, Callan  along with the help of  weapon experts Riot, Backfire, War, Lucia and Shark battle an unstoppable evil empire led by Erlik in the city of Los Angeles. When an ancient Viking called Gunnar, comes to town in search of blood, Callan must stop him before he destroys the world. Erlik and his men Saw, London gangster English and Slag aided by the evil Doctor aim to defeat Callan by helping Gunnar. Detective Nitti plans to find Callan and his team before they do his job for him.

Cast
 Brian Austin Green as Callan
 Patrick Durham as "War"
 Michael Clarke Duncan as Erlik
 John Sachar as "Shark"
 Tom Sizemore as Detective Nitti
 Vinnie Jones as Gunnar
 William Zabka as "Saw"
 Robert Carradine as "Greek"
 Lori Heuring as Lucia
 Tim Abell as "Riot"
 Jake Busey as "Backfire"
 Gianni Capaldi as English
 C. Thomas Howell as Jake
 Susie Abromeit as "Sunshine"
 Danny Trejo as Lexavier
 Roman Mitichyan as Ara
 Tanner Wiley as the Deviant
 Andre Gordon as Ranger
 Branden Cook as "Slag"
 Judy Marie Durham as April

Reception
Cross received generally negative reviews. IGN gave the film an "Awful" rating of 3/10, while DVD Talk's review recommended to "Skip it". CineMagazine gave the film 1 star.

See also

 Cinema of the United States

References

External links
 
 Cross Rotten Tomatoes

2011 films
Films set in California
Films shot in Los Angeles
2010s fantasy action films
American fantasy action films
2010s English-language films
2010s American films